Bandar Al-Shammari (born 6 December 1969) is a Kuwaiti handball player. He competed in the men's tournament at the 1996 Summer Olympics.

References

External links
 

1969 births
Living people
Kuwaiti male handball players
Olympic handball players of Kuwait
Handball players at the 1996 Summer Olympics
Place of birth missing (living people)